The 2013 European Modern Pentathlon Championships were held in Drzonków, Poland from July 11 to 17, 2013.

Medal summary

Men's events

Women's events

Mixed events

Medal table

References

External links
 Results

European Modern Pentathlon Championships
European Modern Pentathlon Championships
European Modern Pentathlon Championships
International sports competitions hosted by Poland
Sport in Lubusz Voivodeship
July 2013 sports events in Europe